Qushui is a town in Jiangcheng Hani and Yi Autonomous County, Yunnan, China. The town sits at the junction of China, Vietnam and Laos.

Administrative division
As of 2016, the town is divided into seven villages: 
 Lvman
 Basan
 Lazhu
 Tianxin
 Longtang
 Gaoshan
 Nuna

History
On December 28, 2012, it was upgraded to a town.

Geography
The town is situated at the eastern Jiangcheng Hani and Yi Autonomous County. The town is bordered to the north by Lüchun County, to the east by Vietnam, to the south by Laos, and to the west by Guoqing Township, Jiahe Township and Menglie Town.

There are five major rivers and streams in the town, namely the Lvman River, Tuka River, Zhengkangba River, Lazhu River, and Tianxin River.

Economy
Agriculture and animal husbandry also play roles in the local economy. The main crops are rice and corn.

Demographics

As of 2017, the National Bureau of Statistics of China estimates the town's population now to be 16,811.

References

Bibliography

Divisions of Jiangcheng Hani and Yi Autonomous County